Andrew Scott Rodriguez (born May 12, 1990) is a former American football player for Army Black Knights of the United States Military Academy.

A graduate of Bishop Ireton High School in Alexandria, Virginia, Rodriguez started in twelve games as a sophomore for the Black Knights. Prior to his junior season, he suffered a serious back injury which caused him to miss the rest of the season but made a comeback for his senior year, for which he was voted captain by his teammates. He won the 2011 James E. Sullivan Award and the William V. Campbell Trophy.

Rodriguez graduated in 2012, ranking third in his class. His father is General David M. Rodriguez, Commanding General of the United States Africa Command (AFRICOM).

References

External links 

 
 Rodriguez Wins 2011 Sullivan Award

1990 births
Living people
American football linebackers
Army Black Knights football players
William V. Campbell Trophy winners
United States Army officers
Sportspeople from Alexandria, Virginia
Players of American football from Virginia